Quedrastichodella gracilis is a wasp species in the genus Quadrastichodella found in Japan .

References

Eulophidae
Hymenoptera of Asia
Insects of Japan